Dayspring or DaySpring or Day spring may refer to:

 The dawn, break of day
 Dayspring, Nigeria, a community in Cross River State, Nigeria
 Dayspring, Nova Scotia, a community in Lunenburg County, Nova Scotia
 Day Spring (Utah), a spring in Utah
 Dellingr, the Norse god, father of Dagr (Day)
 Dayspring or DaySpring, a recording label of Word Records
 DaySpring, a subsidiary of Hallmark Cards
 Dayspring, a centre for spiritual growth founded by Sue Mosteller
 Dayspring, a 1945 novel by Harry Sylvester about the Penitentes (New Mexico)
 Dayspring, a magazine published by the Bahá'í UK National Assembly, see Bahá'í literature
 Dayspring, a fishing smack sunk in World War I List of shipwrecks in May 1918#26 May
 Dayspring, a 36 ft Bermuda sloop owned by Morning Star Trust

See also
 Dayspring Airpark outside Bridgewater, Nova Scotia
 The Dayspring, a 1903 novel by William Francis Barry

Comic book characters
 Aliya Dayspring, a comicbook character 
 Niles Dayspring, List of Amalgam Comics characters
 Tyler Dayspring, a comicbook character